The Central District of Shahin Dezh County is in West Azerbaijan province, Iran. At the National Census in 2006, its population was 68,286 in 16,131 households. The following census in 2011 counted 71,081 people in 19,150 households. At the latest census in 2016, the district had 73,179 inhabitants in 21,872 households.

References 

Shahin Dezh County

Districts of West Azerbaijan Province

Populated places in West Azerbaijan Province

Populated places in Shahin Dezh County